Arthur Millar (1649 – 9 October 1727) was an Anglican bishop in the first third of the 18th century.

Millar was born in 1649 and educated at the University of Aberdeen. He was the incumbent at Dumbarton, Musselburgh then Leith. He was consecrated a college bishop on 22 October 1718 and became Bishop of Edinburgh and Primus of the Scottish Episcopal Church on 5 May 1727.

He died on 9 October 1727.

References

1649 births
Alumni of the University of Aberdeen
18th-century Scottish Episcopalian bishops
Bishops of Edinburgh
Primuses of the Scottish Episcopal Church
18th-century Anglican archbishops
1727 deaths
College bishops